Svea is an unincorporated community in Okaloosa County, Florida, United States.

References

Unincorporated communities in Okaloosa County, Florida
Unincorporated communities in Florida